Syrets is a Kyiv Metro station on the Syretsko-Pecherska Line. Opened in 2004, it is the northwestern terminus.
Traditionally all of the Metro stations in Kyiv were built in several stages including a few stations each (sometimes delivered in various segments). The Syretsky radius was started in the early 1990s, in the midst of economic hardships as a result of which, not only was it many years behind schedule it was also very slow to open new stations.

Syrets was originally to be the fifth station on the radius, but as Lvivska Brama never opened and Vulytsia Hertsena was left as a provision, it became the third on the radius when it opened to the public on 14 October 2004.
The station is not in the vicinity of houses, but is right next to the Syrets railway platform, and as a result most of its passengers are commuters coming from further northwestern districts of the city rather than local residents (which was its original intention).

Designed by architect T. Tselikovskaya, the station is a standard design deep level pylon trivault, but the first in Kyiv to exhibit a new high-tech approach to the design of the stations, over the previous vivid decorations that were inherited from the Soviet times. As a result, the station's walls and the perfectly square pylons are faced with grey marble, and the floor with red and grey granite. Contrasting to that are bright red metallic stripes that run on the lower side of the station wall and on the pylon and intervault wall of the platform and central hall. The niche between the upper vault and the pylon space is done out of beige mettaloplastic (which also has the fluorescent lighting elements) and the upper vaults are covered in plastic planes. In the far end of the central hall, is a neatly arranged artwork based on the same metallic themes.

The station has a large surface vestibule on the corner between the Kotovsky and Stetsenko/Schuseva streets (the latter changes name as it passes under the railway flyover). A four-escalator descent connects it to the station hall.

Presently the station's terminus status is meant to be temporary, and by 2015 the line should continue to expand, finally reaching the northwestern edge of the city with at least three more stations.

See also 
 Syrets Concentration Camp

External links

  Kyivsky Metropoliten - Official site description
  Metropoliten.kiev.ua - Description and photographs (including of construction)
  Skorostnoy Tramavay - Additional photographs
  Kyiv Wiki  - Description

Kyiv Metro stations
Railway stations opened in 2004
2004 establishments in Ukraine